William Francis Paul (1850-4 April, 1928) was a business man in Ipswich, Suffolk who was active in politics and became a benefactor to the town.

William was born in Ipswich in 1850, son of Robert Paul, a corn merchant, and his wife Elizabeth (Woods). When his father died in 1864, William and his brother Robert S. Paul inherited their father's business following a period when it was administered by their maternal uncles. This firm later became known as R. & W. Paul Ltd..

Paul established the William Paul Housing Trust, an Almshouse with 80 properties in Ipswich. The Anchor Hanover Group was the sole trustee in 2022.

References

1850 births
1928 deaths
Businesspeople from Ipswich
Mayors of Ipswich, Suffolk